Kendall David Clements is a New Zealand academic and as of 2021 is a full professor at the University of Auckland specialising in the ecology and evolution of fish.

Career

After a PhD titled  'Gut microorganisms of surgeonfishes (family Acanthuridae)'  at the James Cook University, Clements moved to the University of Auckland, rising to full professor.

Clements is an expert in marine fish ecology and taxonomy, particularly focusing on herbivory in coral reef fishes, and the phylogeny and taxonomy of Kyphosidae (sea chubs) and triplefins.

In July 2021, in the context of a review of the NCEA (New Zealand's National Curriculum), Clements was lead author of a controversial letter "In Defence of Science" in the New Zealand Listener.

Selected works 
 Choat, J., Clements, K. and Robbins, W., 2002. The trophic status of herbivorous fishes on coral reefs. Marine Biology, 140(3), pp. 613–623.
 Angert, Esther R., Kendall D. Clements, and Norman R. Pace. "The largest bacterium." Nature 362, no. 6417 (1993): 239–241.
 Choat, John Howard, and K. D. Clements. "Vertebrate herbivores in marine and terrestrial environments: a nutritional ecology perspective." Annual Review of Ecology and Systematics 29, no. 1 (1998): 375–403.
 Choat, J., K. Clements, and W. Robbins. "The trophic status of herbivorous fishes on coral reefs." Marine Biology 140, no. 3 (2002): 613–623.

References

External links
  

Living people
Academic staff of the University of Auckland
New Zealand biologists
James Cook University alumni
Year of birth missing (living people)